Damao, also known as Big hat in English, is a type of Chinese round hat with a wide brim, which was worn in the Ming dynasty. It was commonly worn by commoners of the Ming dynasty and is often seen in Ming dynasty portraits. It originated in the Yuan dynasty; it was derived from the Mongol's boli hat.

Design and construction 
Damao is composed of a wide brim, a high crown and a long string which is used as a tie. It could be made from straw or fabric.

History

Yuan dynasty 

Boli hat (钹笠帽), a cymbal-shape hat with a round crown and with a brim which extended outwards and downwards, was one of the most popular hats worn by the Mongols (including the Yuan Emperors, officials and male commoners) in the Yuan dynasty. The use of boli hat by the ordinary Mongols in their every day lives in the Yuan dynasty. This eventually influenced the Han Chinese.

Ming dynasty 
The boli hat continued to be used in the Ming dynasty where it was renamed damao in historical documents of the Ming dynasty, which may be because they were rounder and bigger than the futou had traditionally been worn by the Han Chinese. The damao was also widely worn by government clerks and family servants of the Ming officials and the Imperial family, and postmen (yishi 役使). They were also symbols of low-ranking servants as they were commonly worn by family servants; it was worn by people of lower-ranking occupations due to their practicality.

The damao also appeared in the Ming dictionary, Sancai Tuhui, where it is depicted and is called damao; according to the accompanying text in the Sancai Tuhui: in the early Ming dynasty, the Emperor saw the imperial examinees sitting under the sun; therefore he ordered a damao hat for each of the examinees to be worn so that they would be protected from the sun. Since then, the hat was used by kegong (科貢, i.e. nominees for offices).

Similar items 

 Humao
 Weimao
 Gat - A traditional Korean hat

See also 

 Hanfu
 Hufu
 Hanfu headgear

References 

Chinese traditional clothing
Chinese headgear